Tallon Griekspoor (born 2 July 1996) is a Dutch professional tennis player. He has a career-high ATP singles ranking of world No. 36, achieved on 6 March 2023. He also has a career high ATP doubles ranking of World No. 217 achieved on 31 October 2022. Griekspoor is the current Dutch No. 2 men's singles player. He has won a record eight Challenger titles in one season (2021), and became also the first player in history to win five consecutive such titles.

Professional career

2017–2019: ATP debut

Griekspoor made his ATP main draw debut as a wildcard at the 2017 Rotterdam Open in the singles draw against Gilles Müller.
In 2018, at the same tournament a year later, he defeated Grand Slam champion and 5th seed Stan Wawrinka of Switzerland in three sets to reach the second round as a wildcard. And in 2019, Griekspoor defeated the World No.11 and 2nd seed Karen Khachanov in the first round again as a wildcard.

2020–2021: Grand Slam debut, record eight Challenger titles
Griekspoor qualified for the first time in the main singles draw of a Grand Slam tournament at the 2020 Australian Open. He made his top 150 debut on 31 August 2020.

In 2021, Griekspoor won two Challengers tour titles at the 2021 Prague Open and at the 2021 Slovak Open in Bratislava. As a result, he reached a career high ranking of No. 120 on 14 June 2021.

In June 2021, he also qualified for the 2021 Wimbledon Championships for the first time in his career. In July following Wimbledon, as the top seed, he reached also the final of the Challenger 2021 Dutch Open in Amersfoort. He defeated his compatriot and No. 2 seed Botic van de Zandschulp in the final, winning his fifth Challenger. He reached a career-high of No. 105 on 19 July 2021.

At the 2021 US Open he reached the second round of a Major for the first time in his career defeating Jan-Lennard Struff in five sets. He lost to World No. 1 Novak Djokovic in the second round.

In September following the US Open, he won his sixth Challenger title and fourth of the year at the 2021 Murcia Open in Spain defeating top seed Roberto Carballes Baena. The following month he won his fifth Challenger of the year at the 2021 Tennis Napoli Cup in Naples, Italy defeating Andrea Pellegrino. The following week also in Naples, he won his sixth Challenger title of the year at the 2021 Vesuvio Cup defeating Alexander Ritschard. With this victory Griekspoor tied Benjamin Bonzi for the most Challenger titles in 2021. In addition, he joined Facundo Bagnis (2016), Juan Ignacio Chela (2001) and Younes El Aynaoui (1998) as the only players to lift six singles trophies in one season in ATP Challenger history. As a result, he moved 29 positions up in the rankings into the top 100, for the first time in his career, at World No. 89 on 18 October 2021. He won his seventh Challenger title of the season in Tenerife defeating Feliciano Lopez in the final  and becoming the sole record holder for most trophies at that level in a single year. As a result, he moved another 16 positions up to a new career high of No. 72 on 8 November 2021. He won his eighth Challenger at the 2021 Slovak Open II and moved to a new career high ranking of No. 65 on 15 November 2021.

2022: First ATP singles quarterfinal & doubles title, top 50
Griekspoor started his year at the Melbourne Summer Set 1, where he made the quarterfinals after beating 7th seed Dominik Koepfer and Australian Alexei Popyrin. He withdrew from his quarterfinal match against Rafael Nadal due to a foot injury.

At the Australian Open he defeated Fabio Fognini in straight sets in the first round for his first win at this Major and only the second in his career. He lost to 19th seed Pablo Carreño Busta in the second round.

At his home tournament, the  Rotterdam Open he reached the second round as a wildcard, with a victory over seventh seed Aslan Karatsev saving two match points, for his third top-20 win. He recorded  a perfect 3–0 against top-15 players in his home tournament in Rotterdam.

At the 2022 Geneva Open he defeated 6th seed and World No. 33 Tommy Paul in the first round. He reached the third with a win over home qualifier Johan Nikles.

At the 2022 French Open he defeated World No. 28 and 25th seed Alejandro Davidovich Fokina in the first round. Following Wimbledon where he also reached the second round defeating Fabio Fognini, he made his debut in the top 50 at World No. 47 on 11 July 2022. The following week he defended his Challenger title at the 2022 Dutch Open defeating Roberto Carballés Baena in the final.

At the 2022 European Open in Antwerp he won his maiden title in doubles partnering Botic van de Zandschulp.

2023: Maiden ATP singles title, Major and Masters third rounds, top 40
In Pune, Griekspoor reached his maiden ATP singles semifinal, beating Jaume Munar and Marco Cecchinato, then receiving a walkover against top seed Marin Čilić. He defeated 8th seed Aslan Karatsev in the semifinals in straight sets to reach the final, where he defeated Benjamin Bonzi in three sets to win his maiden ATP Tour singles title.

At the Australian Open, Griekspoor reached the third round of a Grand Slam for the first time in his career, beating Pavel Kotov and 32nd seed, compatriot Botic van de Zandschulp. He lost to third seed and eventual finalist Stefanos Tsitsipas in the third round.

Griekspoor made the quarterfinals in Rotterdam, after defeating Mikael Ymer and eight seed Alexander Zverev, his fourth top-20 win. He recorded a perfect 4–0 against top-20 players in his home tournament. Next he defeated Gijs Brouwer to reach his second semifinal of the season and overall and first career semifinal of an ATP 500 tournament. It was the first time since Igor Sijsling in 2014 (who also coincidentally was coached by Dennis Schenk) that a Dutch wildcard reached the semifinals at the home tournament. It was also the first time a Dutch duo, Griekspoor and Brouwer, reached the quarterfinals of the home tournament, since Raemon Sluiter and Sjeng Schalken in 2003. He lost to Jannik Sinner in straight sets. As a result he reached a new career high in the top 40 in the rankings.

Seeded 31th at the 2023 BNP Paribas Open he reached the third round of a Masters for the first time in his career, defeating Guido Pella having received a bye in the first round. He lost to top seed Carlos Alcaraz.

Personal life
He is the younger brother of  twin brothers and retired tennis players Scott Griekspoor and Kevin Griekspoor who are five years older and peaked at No. 205 and No. 655 respectively in the ATP rankings.

Performance timeline

Current after the 2023 Dubai Open

ATP career finals

Singles: 1 (1 title)

Doubles: 1 (1 title)

Challenger and Futures finals

Singles: 26 (18–8)

Doubles: 16 (7–9)

Record against top-10 players
Griekspoor's record against players who have been ranked in the top 10, with those who are active in boldface. Only ATP Tour main draw matches are considered:

References

External links
 
 
 

1996 births
Living people
Dutch male tennis players
Sportspeople from Haarlem
20th-century Dutch people
21st-century Dutch people